Häljarp is a locality situated in Landskrona Municipality, Skåne County, Sweden with 2,795 inhabitants in 2010.
Häljarp has several schools, a supermarket, two pizzerias and a train station connected to West Coast Line (Sweden). Häljarp has trains going to Malmö, Lund, Helsingborg and several smaller towns and villages.

Sports
The following sports clubs are located in Häljarp:

 Häljarps IF
 Häljarps SK

References 

Populated places in Landskrona Municipality
Populated places in Skåne County